Scolopax anthonyi is a prehistoric species of woodcock in the family Scolopacidae that was once endemic to the Caribbean island of Puerto Rico.

Taxonomy 
Its fossil remains were initially identified as belonging to a snipe of the genus Gallinago, but a re-analysis of the bones in 1976 indicated that they belonged to a woodcock. It has more osteological similarities to the Eurasian woodcock than the American woodcock, a trait it shares with the similarly-extinct Scolopax brachycarpa of Hispaniola. Both of these species may have belonged to a distinct insular radiation in the Caribbean, which are now extinct.

Description 
Scolopax anthonyi had reduced wings compared to other species in the genus, indicating that it may have had a more terrestrial lifestyle or even may have been flightless. It likely lived in a forested habitat, like extant members of the genus. Little is known about the cause for its extinction.

References

anthonyi
†
Extinct birds of the Caribbean
Late Quaternary prehistoric birds
Birds described in 1920
Fossil taxa described in 1920
Taxa named by Alexander Wetmore